Harry Thomas Oulton Wilding (27 June 1894 – 1958) was an English professional footballer who played for the Grenadier Guards, Chelsea, Tottenham Hotspur and Bristol Rovers.

Football career 
Wilding played football while serving with the Grenadier Guards. In 1919 he joined Chelsea where he played in a total of 265 matches and scored on 25 occasions in all competitions. The centre half signed for Tottenham Hotspur in 1928 and featured in 12 matches and scored one goal. After leaving White Hart Lane, Wilding joined Bristol Rovers where he ended his playing career.

References 

1894 births
1958 deaths
English footballers
Footballers from Wolverhampton
English Football League players
Chelsea F.C. players
Tottenham Hotspur F.C. players
Bristol Rovers F.C. players
Association football central defenders